Ashland is a city in Jackson County, Oregon, United States. It lies along Interstate 5 approximately 16 miles (26 km) north of the California border and near the south end of the Rogue Valley. The city's population was 21,360 at the 2020 census.

The city is the home of Southern Oregon University (SOU) and the Oregon Shakespeare Festival (OSF). These are important to Ashland's economy, which also depends on restaurants, galleries, and retail stores that cater to tourists. Lithia Park along Ashland Creek, historic buildings, and a paved intercity bike trail provide additional visitor attractions.

Ashland, originally called "Ashland Mills", was named after Ashland County, Ohio, the original home of founder Abel Helman, and secondarily for Ashland, Kentucky, where other founders had family connections. Ashland has a council-manager government assisted by citizen committees. Historically, its liberal politics have differed, often sharply, with much of the rest of southwest Oregon.

History
Prior to the arrival of white settlers in mid-19th century, the Shasta people lived in the valley along Ashland Creek approximately where today's city is located. Early Hudson's Bay Company hunters and trappers following the Siskiyou Trail passed through the site in the 1820s. In the late 1840s, mainly American settlers following the Applegate Trail began passing through the area. By the early 1850s, the Donation Land Claim Act brought many to the Rogue Valley and into conflict with its native people. These often violent clashes, known ultimately as the Rogue River Wars, continued until 1856.

In 1851, gold was discovered at Rich Gulch, a tributary of Jackson Creek, and a tent city grew on its banks, today's  Jacksonville. Settlers arrived in the Ashland area in January 1852, including Robert B. Hargadine, Sylvester Pease, Abel D. Helman, Eber Emery, and others. Helman and Hargadine filed the first donation land claims in Ashland. Helman and Emery built a sawmill along what was then called Mill Creek to turn timber into lumber for settlers. In 1854, they and another settler, M. B. Morris, built a second mill, Ashland Flouring Mills, to grind local wheat into flour. The community around the mill became known as "Ashland Mills". A post office was established in Ashland Mills in 1855 with Helman as postmaster.

During the 1860s and 1870s the community grew, establishing a school, churches, businesses and a large employer, Ashland Woolen Mills, which produced clothing and blankets from local wool. In 1871, the Post Office dropped "Mills" from Ashland's name. In 1872 Reverend J. H. Skidmore opened a college, Ashland Academy, a predecessor of Southern Oregon University.

In 1887, Portland, Oregon and San Francisco, California were joined by rail at Ashland. Until 1926, when most rail service began taking a different route (east through Klamath Falls to avoid the steep grade through the Siskiyou Mountains), Ashland thrived on rail trade of local products, including pears, peaches, and apples.

In 1908, the Women's Civic Improvement Club petitioned for the creation of community space along Ashland Creek, which became Ashland Canyon Park. The discovery of lithia water near Emigrant Lake around the same time led to a plan to establish a mineral spa at the park. Voters approved bonds to pay for the project, which included piping the mineral water from its source to Ashland. The town engaged John McLaren, landscape architect of San Francisco's Golden Gate Park, to design the park, renamed Lithia Springs Park, later shortened to Lithia Park. Although the park was popular, the mineral spa plans proved too expensive for local taxpayers and were abandoned in 1916. Meanwhile, entrepreneurs took to bottling and selling mineral waters from the area's springs.

During the Fourth of July celebration in 1935, Angus L. Bowmer arranged the first performances of what would become the Oregon Shakespeare Festival. The festival has grown since then, and has become an award-winning and internationally-known regional theater company.

Many of Ashland's historic buildings have been preserved and restored. The city has 59 individual structures and four historic districts (Downtown District, Siskiyou-Hargadine District, Railroad District, Skidmore Academy District) on the National Register of Historic Places. The structures include the Enders Building (home of the Columbia Hotel), which from 1910 to 1928 contained the largest mercantile establishment between Sacramento and Portland.

Geography

Upstream (south) of the city boundary, these streams flow mainly through the Rogue River–Siskiyou National Forest. The creek flows through the city to meet Bear Creek, which roughly parallels I-5 along the east side of Ashland. Bear Creek, one of many streams in the Rogue Valley, flows generally northwest to join the Rogue River near Gold Hill, and from there the river flows generally west to its mouth on the Pacific Ocean.

Oregon Route 99, running roughly parallel to I-5, passes through downtown Ashland. Oregon Route 66 enters Ashland from the east and intersects Route 99 near the city center. Route 66 leads east  to Klamath Falls.

Climate
Ashland lies within Oregon's southwest interior climate zone, in which all but the higher-elevation sites are in the rain shadow of the Oregon Coast Range to the west. The largest urban areas in this zone in addition to Ashland are Medford and Grants Pass in the Rogue Valley, and Roseburg in the Umpqua River Valley further north. This valley climate is particularly good for growing fruit, especially pears, and for producing other crops and farm goods such as hay, grain, poultry, and beef.

Cloud cover in nearby Medford varies from an average of 21 percent in July to 86 percent in December. The average annual snowfall is only . The average relative humidity, measured at 4 p.m. daily, is 47 percent in Medford, varying from 26 percent in July to 76 percent in December. According to the Köppen climate classification system, Ashland has a warm-summer Mediterranean climate (Csb).

Warm summer nights are rare, with the record of  being set as far back as 1910. The mean for the warmest summer night between 1991 and 2020 was at a mild .

Demographics

In the census of 2010, there were 20,078 people, 9,409 households, and 4,542 families residing in the city. The racial makeup of the city was about 90% White, 2% Asian, 1% African American, 1% Native American, 0.3% Pacific Islander, 1.4% from other races, and 4% from two or more races. Hispanic or Latino of any race were about 5% of the population.

There were 9,409 households, out of which about 21% had children under the age of 18 living with them. About 34% were married couples living together; 10% had a female householder with no husband present, about 4% had a male householder with no wife present, and about 52% were non-families. About 38% of all households were made up of individuals, and 13.5% had someone living alone who was 65 years of age or older. The average household size was 2.03 and the average family size was 2.63.

The median age in the city was 42.9 years. About 16% of residents were under the age of 18, and about 16% were between the ages of 18 and 24. Rounded to the nearest whole number, 21% were from 25 to 44 years old; 30% were from 45 to 64; and 18% were 65 years of age or older. The gender makeup of the city was about 46% male and 54% female.

In 2010, the median income for a household in the city was $41,334, and the median income for a family was $58,409. Males had a median income of $50,368 versus $34,202 for females. The per capita income for the city was $28,941. About 21% of the population and 13% of families had incomes below the poverty line. Out of the total population, about 30% of those under the age of 18 and 3.5% of those 65 and older were living below the poverty line.

Government
Ashland has a council-manager government since a Charter Amendment was passed by the voters in a Special Election in May 2020, (changing the form of government from Mayor/Administrator). It consists of a city manager, a mayor, and six council members. The mayor and council members are elected by the city's voters to serve staggered four-year terms. 

Julie Akins, after serving a partial term as a city councilor, was elected as mayor in 2020. On January 23, 2023, she announced her resignation effective January 27. On February 7, the council unanimously elected Tonya Graham to served the remainder of Akins' term.

Pam Marsh, a Democrat from Ashland, represents Ashland and all of Oregon House District 5 in the state legislature. As part of Oregon Senate District 3, Ashland is represented by Democrat Jeff Golden. At the federal level, Cliff Bentz, a Republican, represents Ashland as part of Oregon's 2nd congressional district in the United States House of Representatives. Ron Wyden and Jeff Merkley, both Democrats, serve the state of Oregon in the United States Senate.

Historically, Ashland has been something of a political outlier in southwest Oregon. In the presidential election of 1860, Ashland favored Abraham Lincoln while its neighbors strongly preferred pro-slavery candidates. In the early 1900s, Ashland voters supported women's suffrage and prohibition, generally out of step with the rest of the region. In more recent elections, liberal Ashland has supported tax levies and environmental regulations opposed by voters elsewhere in Jackson and nearby counties. Critics sometimes refer to the city as the People's Republic of Ashland.

Economy
Income from tourism is important to Ashland's economy. A large number of restaurants, galleries, and retail stores cater to thousands of visitors who attend plays each year at the Oregon Shakespeare Festival. In 2011, the festival sold more than 390,000 tickets to its theater productions.

The town's largest employer is Southern Oregon University (SOU), which has a faculty and staff of more than 750. In addition to the Oregon Shakespeare Festival and the university, health-service providers make significant contributions to the economy. Businesses related to outdoor recreation, transportation, technology, and light manufacturing are also important. In 2010, the Shakespeare Festival employed about 500 people, the hospital about 400, the public schools about 300, and the City of Ashland about 250. The Bathroom Readers' Press, which produces the Uncle John's Bathroom Reader books, is based in Ashland and San Diego. Brammo, specializing in battery-electric motorcycles, was based in Ashland but moved to Talent.

Arts and culture

The Oregon Shakespeare Festival has grown from a summer outdoor series in the 1930s to a season that stretches from February to October, incorporating Shakespearean and non-Shakespearean plays at three theaters. The OSF has become the largest regional repertory theater in the United States.

The Oregon Cabaret Theater features musicals and comedy throughout the year. Opened in 1986, the dinner theater occupies a former First Baptist Church built in Mission Revival style. The Ashland Independent Film Festival, which shows international and domestic films of almost every genre, takes place each April in the Varsity Theatre downtown. About 90 films are shown during the five days of the festival. In 2009, Ashland was the setting for the film adaptation of Neil Gaiman's Coraline.

The Oregon Center for the Arts at Southern Oregon University focuses on academic programs including creative arts (art, emerging media and creative writing), music, and theater. Affiliated with the center is the Schneider Museum of Art, which has rotation exhibitions of works featuring  professional contemporary artists. Also affiliated with the center are chamber music concerts, a Shakespeare institute, a piano series, and other art-related events.

The annual Ashland New Plays Festival (ANPF) is a nonprofit organization that encourages playwrights to develop new work through public readings. Each year, the ANPF holds an international competition that winnows hundreds of submissions to four plays that are read to live audiences by professional actors during a five-day festival in October.

Museums and other points of interest
The National Fish and Wildlife Forensics Laboratory in Ashland is the world's only laboratory dedicated to solving crimes against wildlife. Using forensic science, experts at the laboratory help wildlife officers to investigate possible crimes against animals and to establish links between victims and suspects in cases that go to court. The laboratory has assisted the International Criminal Police Organization (INTERPOL) and foreign agencies concerned with the Convention on International Trade in Endangered Species (CITES).

The Ashland City Band (ACB) was organized in the late 19th century as the Ashland Brass Band. The band used an octagonal gazebo-style bandstand in Lithia Park until the Butler Memorial Band Shell was built in Lithia Park in 1946. The ACB gives public concerts there each summer between June and August.

Parks

Lithia Park is a  park, including  on the National Register of Historic Places, that begins near the downtown shopping area and extends upstream along Ashland Creek near the center of the city. It includes two ponds, a Japanese garden, tennis courts, two public greens, a bandshell (outdoor stage) and miles of hiking trails.  The name Lithia comes from natural mineral water found in the Ashland area. It has a strong mineral taste and slight effervescence, and the lithia water fountains found on the town plaza are frequently tasted by unsuspecting tourists (often at the behest of residents or frequent visitors who use the fountains as a cheap, humorous Ashland initiation rite).

A hiking and biking path, the Bear Creek Greenway, begins in Ashland near the intersection of West Nevada Street with Helman Street, close to the confluence of Ashland Creek (which flows through Lithia Park).  The  path follows Bear Creek between Ashland and Central Point and passes through Talent, Phoenix, and Medford. 

Calle Guanajuato is a small park bordering Ashland Creek, with several restaurants offering outdoor dining.

Education

Southern Oregon University, a public co-ed four-year university founded in 1926, offers courses of study toward degrees in the liberal arts, science, business, and education. With an enrollment of about 4,400 undergraduates as of Fall 2020, this urban university also offers graduate-level programs on its  campus.

In 2020–21, about 59 percent of the university's students were women, and about 38 percent were men, while 3 percent were listed as other/unknown. The student–faculty ratio in 2020–21 was 19 to 1. Full-time undergraduate tuition in 2020–21 was about $11,000 per year for Oregon residents and $28,000 for non-residents.

The Ashland School District oversees three elementary schools, one of which is a magnet school focused on science and the arts; one middle school; one high school; and a community learning center. Ashland High School was ranked 1,395th best among the nation's public high schools and 15th best in Oregon by U.S. News & World Report as of 2013.

Media

The Mail Tribune, a newspaper based in Medford that published print editions several days a week, served Ashland until it ceased operations on January 13, 2023. The newspaper also owned the Ashland Daily Tidings, which ran Monday through Saturday until 2019. A non-profit news organization, Ashland.news, was founded in 2022 by a former Daily Tidings editor.

Fifteen radio stations operate in the region around Ashland, including Jefferson Public Radio and KSKQ, an independent non-profit broadcasting at 89.5 FM. A former student-run radio station with the call letters  KSOC and the nickname "Radio Free Ashland" shut down in February 2013 after 14 years of broadcasting. Rogue Valley Community Television, based at Southern Oregon University, serves Jackson and Josephine counties. Ashland has no commercial television stations, but nearby Medford has seven.

Infrastructure and public services
The Asante Ashland Community Hospital is a general medical and surgical hospital that is part of the Asante health network based in Medford. As of 2015, it has 49 inpatient beds.

The Ashland Public Library building was expanded from the city's original Carnegie library. In 2003, the historic Carnegie portion of the library was restored. In 2006, budget problems led to the closing in April 2007 of the Ashland Library and 14 others in Jackson County. The event, which lasted until October 2007, was the largest library closure in U.S. history. Although some of its services are handled by a private company, Library Systems and Services, the Ashland branch remains part of the Jackson County network of public libraries.

Rogue Valley Transportation District (RVTD) provides bus service to much of the city, with connections to Medford, Central Point, Talent, Phoenix, White City, and Jacksonville.  In Medford, passengers can connect to other regional bus lines, including the Southwest POINT, a daily shuttle carrying passengers between Brookings and the Amtrak station in Klamath Falls. The Klamath Falls Amtrak Station serves the Coast Starlight long-haul passenger train on track owned by the Union Pacific Railroad. Ashland Municipal Airport, with a  asphalt runway, offers general aviation services. Medford International Airport,  from Ashland, also serves the city.

The City of Ashland moved to improve local broadband Internet access in the late 1990s by creating the Ashland Fiber Network (AFN) and building a fiber optic ring inside the city boundaries. However, by 2006 the city faced difficulties servicing AFN's debt load, which was approaching $15.5 million. The city hired a new AFN director, Joe Franell, who suggested scrapping cable television service while retaining the more profitable high-speed Internet access. In October 2006, the cable television service was transferred to a local company, Ashland Home Net, while the City retained both the infrastructure and the wholesale Internet business.

In popular culture
 The Bakeshop Mystery series by Ellie Alexander, which began with the 2014 publication of Meet Your Baker, is set in Ashland. The heroine of the series owns an artisan bakeshop on the Plaza, and the novels often feature local landmarks and institutions such as Lithia Park, Oregon State University, and the Oregon Shakespeare Festival.
 Coraline is set in a fictionalized version of Ashland. The city was chosen due to its status as home of the Oregon Shakespeare Festival, as Miss Fink and Miss Forcible, two supporting characters in the film, are retired Shakespearean actresses.

Sister city
Ashland has one sister city:

 Guanajuato, Mexico

Notable people

Harry Anderson (1952–2018), magician and TV actor
Les AuCoin (1942–), former congressman
Tai Babilonia (1959–), champion pairs figure skater
John Backus (1924–2007), computer scientist who created Fortran
Dallen Bounds  (1971-1999), serial killer
Angus L. Bowmer (1904–1979), founder of the Oregon Shakespeare Festival
Erskine Caldwell (1903–1987), author, never lived in Ashland, but is buried there
Craig Chaquico (1954–), guitarist formerly with Jefferson Starship
Gretchen Corbett (1947–), actress, debuted as Desdemona at the OSF
Chad Cota (1971–), former National Football League player
Catherine E. Coulson (1943–2015), stage and screen actress
Alex Cox (1954–), film director
Ann Curry (1956–), former anchor on The Today Show
Ana Delfosse (1931–2017), Formula One mechanic and driver in Argentina; gas-station operator in Ashland
Alice DiMicele (1965–), musician
Jack Elam (1920–2003), actor
Gordon Fee (1934-), American-Canadian theologian
David Fincher (1962–), film director

Gloria Greer (1908-1931), actress
Johnny Gruelle (1880-1938), creator of Raggedy Ann and Raggedy Andy 
Jeremy Guthrie (1979–), pitcher for the Kansas City Royals
Anthony Heald (1944–), television, film, and stage actor
Abel Helman (1824–1910), town founder
Frank C. High (1875–1966), Medal of Honor recipient for actions during the Philippine–American War
Gary "Chicken" Hirsh (1940–), former drummer for Country Joe and the Fish
Peter Hollens (1982–), independent a capella singer/songwriter
Jean Houston (1937–), author, lecturer, known for her work in human potentials, Mystery School and Social Artistry
Lawson Fusao Inada (1938–), Oregon Poet Laureate 2006–10, Professor Emeritus at Southern Oregon University
Dean Ing (1931–), author
Forrest Kline (1983–), musician
Otto Klum (1892–1944), football coach
Tonya Knight (1966–), bodybuilder, actress, model
Hal Koerner (1976–), ultramarathon runner, two-time winner of the Western States Endurance Run
Winona LaDuke (1959–), Native American activist and vice-presidential candidate for the Ralph Nader presidential campaign, 2000
Leonard Levy (1923–2006), Pulitzer Prize-winning historian
Rose Maddox (1925–1998), country-western musician
Steve Mason (1949–2005), "poet laureate" of the Vietnam Veterans of America
Vladimir Nabokov (1899–1977), author of Lolita

Mark Parent (1961–), former baseball player and currently bench coach for the Chicago White Sox
Alfred Peet (1920–2007), founder of Peet's Coffee & Tea
Jim Perry (1933–2015), television personality
Bill Rauch (1962-), American theater director; directed the Oregon Shakespeare Festival from 2007 to 2019
Tucker Reed (1989-), blogger, author, journalist and activist
Jeff Rense, talk-radio host
Ron Rezek (1946–), industrial designer and inventor
Sonny Sixkiller (1951–), former National Football League quarterback
Jon Micah Sumrall (1980–), lead singer of Christian rock band Kutless
Jerry Turner (1927–2004), stage designer and director
Larry Wagner (1907–2002), arranger and composer for Paul Whiteman and the Casa Loma Orchestra
Neale Donald Walsch (1943–), author of the Conversations with God series
Henry Woronicz (1954–), actor and director

Johnny Harris (1988–) American journalist famous for Vox Media

References

Works cited

External links

 City of Ashland official website
 

 
1852 establishments in Oregon Territory
Cities in Jackson County, Oregon
Cities in Oregon
Populated places established in 1852